A naval division is a subdivision of a squadron or flotilla. It can also be a subdivision of a fleet. A division is the smallest naval formation, most commonly numbering between two to four ships.

Command element 
A division is usually commanded by senior flag officer, most commonly a vice admiral or rear admiral, irrespective of the division's size. For example, in the Imperial Japanese Navy the First Carrier Division was commanded by a rear or vice admiral, same as the 18th Cruiser Division.

Division types 
Divisions are most commonly grouped by ship class and type, dependent on how the respective nation's navy is organised. Examples of division types include:
Submarine Division – 24th Submarine Division (Soviet Navy and Russian Navy) – six submarines
Minesweeper Division – Mine Division 71 (United States Navy) – two minesweepers 
Sloop Division – 2nd Escort Group (Royal Navy) – six sloops
Destroyer Division – Destroyer Division 22 (United States Navy) – four destroyers 
Cruiser Division – 18th Cruiser Division (Imperial Japanese Navy) – two light cruisers
Battleship Division – Battleship Division 2 (United States Navy) – four battleships
Carrier Division – Second Carrier Division (Imperial Japanese Navy) – two aircraft carriers

See also 
 BatDiv
 Destroyer squadron

References 
Peattie, Mark R. (1999). Sunburst: The Rise of Japanese Naval Air Power 1909–1941. Annapolis, Maryland: Naval Institute Press. .
Morison, Samuel E. (1963). The Two-Ocean War: A Short History of the United States Navy in the Second World War. New York City: Little, Brown and Company. 

Naval units and formations by size